The National Indian Gaming Association    (NIGA) is a nonprofit organization founded in 1985 made up of 184 Indian Nations in the United States, with additional nonvoting associate members. The purpose of the NIGA is "to protect and preserve the general welfare of tribes striving for self-sufficiency through gaming enterprises in Indian country," and to "maintain and protect Indian sovereign governmental authority in Indian Country."

The NIGA seeks to advance the lives of Indian people economically, socially, and politically.  To fulfil its mission, the NIGA works with the federal government and members of Congress to develop sound policies and practices and to provide technical assistance and advocacy on gaming issues. The NIGA's office building is located in Washington, D.C. The NIGA headquarters building was purchased by a tribal collective.  It is the first structure to be owned by Native Americans in Washington, D.C. NIGA is presided by Ernest L. Stevens, Jr. who serves as the chairman and by Andy Ebona acting as the treasurer.

The chairman, Ernest L. Stevens, Jr is one of six recipients of the "Path Breaker" award, which is awarded to individuals who have had a positive impact on Indian gaming. The treasurer, Andy Ebona, is also a member of the Douglas Indian Association which represents the T’aaḵu Kwáan . Ebona is also vice president of Native Beverage Group, Chairman of the Advisory Board of Spirit of Sovereignty, and Owner of Copper Shield Consulting LLC which works with Tribes and villages on economic and community development projects.

Activities 
On May 13, 2014 the NIGA held their 29th Annual tradeshow and Convention in the San Diego Convention Center where a premier showcase of Native culture was on display.
In March 2018 Ernest L. Stevens, Jr and Andy Ebona attended the tribal business summit in Britain in the House of Lords in the presence of the Baroness of Winterbourne. On April 3, 2019, NIGA honored seven women elected Tribal Leaders in recognition of their commitment and leadership for their Tribal Nations and all of Indian Country.

References 

1985 establishments in the United States
Organizations established in 1985